The Roman Catholic Diocese of Caetité is a diocese located in the city of Caetité in the Ecclesiastical province of Vitória da Conquista in Brazil.

History
 20 October 1913: Established as Diocese of Caetité from the Metropolitan Archdiocese of São Salvador da Bahia

Leadership
 Bishops of Caetité (Roman rite), in reverse chronological order
 Bishop José Roberto Silva Carvalho (2016 10.26 - present)
 Bishop Guerrino Riccardo Brusati (2002.11.13 – 2015.05.27), appointed Bishop of Janaúba, Minas Gerais
 Bishop Antônio Alberto Guimarães Rezende, C.S.S. (1981.11.09 – 2002.11.13)
 Bishop Eliseu Maria Gomes de Oliveira, O. Carm. (1974.02.05 – 1980.09.24), appointed Bishop of Itabuna, Bahia
 Bishop Silvério Paulo de Albuquerque, O.F.M. (1970.03.17 – 1973.01.18), appointed Bishop of Feira de Santana, Bahia
 Bishop José Pedro de Araújo Costa (1957.05.25 – 1968.12.28), appointed Coadjutor Archbishop of Uberaba, Minas Gerais
 Bishop José Terceiro de Sousa (1948.02.13 – 1955.12.09)
 Bishop Juvéncio de Brito (1926.12.23 – 1945.12.15), appointed Bishop of Garanhuns, Pernambuco
 Bishop Manoel Raymundo de Mello (1914.08.18 – 1923.07.30)

References
 GCatholic.org
 Catholic Hierarchy

Roman Catholic dioceses in Brazil
Christian organizations established in 1913
Caetité, Roman Catholic Diocese of
Roman Catholic dioceses and prelatures established in the 20th century
1913 establishments in Brazil